Larry Nemecek (born January 18, 1959) is an American who has worked in various capacities on the Star Trek franchise.

Professional career
He has portrayed Dr. McCoy in the Star Trek Continues web series episodes "Pilgrim of Eternity" and "Lolani" and served as the series' Creative Consultant. Nemecek has acted in and produced a number of different Star Trek related media products, both in a professional capacity and as an enthusiast.

Personal life
Nemecek holds a theatre and communications BA from East Central University in Ada, Oklahoma, and an MA in theatre/directing from the University of Kansas. He is married to Janet Nemecek. Nemecek was a founding committee member for the non-profit Soonercon charity sci-fi fan convention in 1986 after graduate school, and founded the Trek-focused non-profit ThunderCon media fan convention in 1991.

Bibliography

 1988: TNG-1: A Concordance and Episode Guide - Author
 1989:
 TNG-1: A Concordance and Episode Guide (updated) - Author
 TNG-2: A Concordance and Episode Guide - Author
 1990: TNG-3: A Concordance and Episode Guide - Author
 1992:
 TNG-4: A Concordance and Episode Guide - Author
 1993:
 TNG-5: A Concordance - Author
 Star Trek: The Next Generation Companion - Author
 1994: 
 DS9-1: A Concordance and Episode Guide - Author
Star Trek: Voyager Episode "Prophecy" - Writer (story; with J. Kelley Burke)
 1995: Star Trek: The Next Generation Companion (updated) - Author
 1996:
 DS9-2: A Concordance and Episode Guide - Author
 The Making of Star Trek: First Contact - Author (with Lou Anders and Ian Spelling)
 Star Trek Magazine - Contributor (columnist, interviewer/feature writer)
 1997: Star Trek Fact Files - Contributor (author, photo editor and researcher)
 1998: Star Trek Communicator - Managing editor, contributor
 1999:
Star Trek: The Magazine - Contributor (author, photo editor, researcher and interviews)
Star Trek: The Next Generation Companion (CD version) - Author
 2002: Star Trek: Star Charts - Contributor (Chapter introductions, research)
 2003: Star Trek: The Next Generation Companion (updated) - Author
 2005: Star Trek: The Collector's Edition - Contributor (episode notes)
 2011: The Official Star Trek The Next Generation: Build the USS Enterprise NCC-1701-D - Contributor (interviews)
 2013: Stellar Cartography: The Starfleet Reference Library - Author
 2018: Stellar Cartography: The Starfleet Reference Library: Updated Edition - Author

Filmography

 2002: "Starfleet Moments & Memories Year Seven" ("A Unique Family"), TNG Season 7 DVD special feature - interviewed on March 20, 2002
 2003: After They Were Famous: Star Trek - Consultant
 2004: Star Trek: New Voyages: Come What May - portrayed Cal Strickland
 2005: Star Trek: Enterprise Episode "These Are the Voyages..." - cameoed as a Unnamed Human ceremony attendee
 2006: Star Trek: New Voyages: To Serve All My Days - portrayed Esterion Captain
 2009: Trek Roundtable: First Contact (Star Trek: First Contact (2009 DVD) special feature) - Host
 2009: Star Trek VI: The Undiscovered Country Star Trek: Original Motion Picture Collection Blu-ray (special feature) - Audio commentary
 2010: The Captains of The Final Frontier - Consultant, Guest
 2011: Star Trek: New Voyages: No-Win Scenario (Vignette Episode) - portrayed Tellarite Grolst [NOTE: This episode was originally filmed in 2005, but was not released until 2011.]
 2011: G4's Proving Ground: "Star Trek" - portrayed Star Trek Guest Consultant
 2011: Trek Nation - Guest
 2013: Star Trek Continues: Pilgrim of Eternity - portrayed Leonard McCoy  2014: Star Trek Continues: Lolani - portrayed Leonard McCoy, Creative Consultant
 2014: Star Trek Continues: Fairest of Them All - Creative Consultant
 2014: The Green Girl - Guest
 2015: Star Trek Continues: Divided We Stand - Creative Consultant
 2015: Star Trek Continues: The White Iris - Creative Consultant
 2015: Our Star Trek: The Fifty-Year Mission - Creative Consultant, Guest
 2016: Star Trek Continues: Come Not Between The Dragons - Creative Consultant
 2016: Red Shirt Diaries: Operation: Annihilate - Dr. McCoy
 2016: Star Trek Continues: Embracing The Winds - Creative Consultant
 2017: Star Trek Continues: Still Treads the Shadow - Creative Consultant
 2017: Star Trek Continues: What Ships Are For - Creative Consultant
 2017: Star Trek Continues: To Boldly Go: Part I - Creative Consultant
 2017: Star Trek Continues: To Boldly Go: Part II'' - Creative Consultant

References

External links
 
 Larry Nemecek's official archives and website
 THE TREK FILES podcast from Roddenberry Podcast Network
 TREKLAND TUESDAYS LIVE talkback show on Facebook
 Larry Nemecek's TREKLAND blog and vidblog
 "The Con of Wrath" documentary project
 "TREKLAND: On Speaker" archival audio series
 1996 Interview at StarTrek.com
 2012 Interview at reporter-times.com
 2015 Interview at normanmagazine.com
 2012 interview at technorati.com
 2016 interview at oklahoman.com
 Interview at StarTrek.com (with Geoffrey Mandel)
 

Living people
1959 births
East Central University alumni
University of Kansas alumni